Martindale is a CTrain light rail station in Martindale, Calgary, Alberta. It serves the Northeast Line (Route 202). It opened August 27, 2012.

The station was constructed as part of a 2.9-kilometre extension of the Northeast line from McKnight–Westwinds station to Saddletowne station. It is located in a reserved right-of-way within its community, with the side-loading platforms to be staggered west and east of Martindale Boulevard. Due to its location in a residential area primarily serving local residents, there are no park-and-ride lots at the station nor a bus terminal, unlike most other CTrain stations in Calgary. Also, because of its location, CTrain speeds are reduced to 50 km/h (30 mph) in the general area.

In its first year of service, Martindale served an average of 2,400 boardings per day. 

The opening of the Northeast extension was delayed by almost one year as the extension was originally planned to be open in late 2011.

References

CTrain stations
Railway stations in Canada opened in 2012
2012 establishments in Alberta